Towchal (also Romanized as Towchāl; also known as Tow Chāh, Tū Chāh, and Tu-i-Chāh) is a village in Kharturan Rural District, Beyarjomand District, Shahrud County, Semnan Province, Iran. At the 2006 census, its population was 26, in 8 families.

References 

Populated places in Shahrud County